The River Purwell is a chalk stream in Hertfordshire, England. The entire course of the stream is near Hitchin.

Its source is springs which rise out of the chalk bedrock at St Ippolyts, forming Ippollitts Brook. It is known as the Purwell by the time it reaches Ninesprings on the border of the parishes of Great Wymondley and Hitchin. It flows on to join the River Hiz.

The river and associated wetlands are protected by nature reserves at Ninesprings and Purwell Meadows.

Purwell Mill
At Purwell Meadows the river powered a watermill until the 1920s. The existing building is a couple of hundred years old, but a mill at this site is mentioned in the Domesday Book. This document from 1086 recorded a mill worth 20s in the part of Great Wymondley belonging to King William. Because part of the mill extended over the river to the opposite bank, in Hitchin manor, the Manor of Great Wymondley had to pay an annual fee of 6d.

References

Purwell
Purwell